Kevin Whately (born 6 February 1951) is an English actor. He is best known for his roles as Neville "Nev" Hope in the British comedy drama Auf Wiedersehen, Pet; Robert "Robbie" Lewis in the crime dramas Inspector Morse (1987–2000) and Lewis (2006–2015); and Jack Kerruish in the drama series Peak Practice, although he has appeared in numerous other roles.

Early life
Whately is from Humshaugh, near Hexham, Northumberland. His mother, Mary (née Pickering), was a teacher and his father, Richard, was a Commander in the Royal Navy. His maternal grandmother, Doris Phillips, was a professional concert singer, his paternal grandfather, Herbert Whately, was Archdeacon of Ludlow, and his great-great-grandfather, Richard Whately, was Anglican Archbishop of Dublin. The BBC documentary Who Do You Think You Are?, broadcast on 2 March 2009, also revealed that Whately is a descendant, on his paternal side, of Thomas Whately of Nonsuch Park (father of Thomas Whately), a leading London merchant, English politician and writer who became a director of the Bank of England, and of Major Robert Thompson, a staunch supporter of the Parliamentarian cause at the time of the English Commonwealth who later settled in Virginia, where he became a pioneer tobacco plantation owner.

Whately was educated at Barnard Castle School, and went on to study accounting and finance at Newcastle Polytechnic, graduating in 1969. He then trained as an actor at the Central School of Speech and Drama, graduating in 1975 after having partly supported himself by working for the National Theatre at The Old Vic. Before going professional, Whately was an amateur actor at the People's Theatre in Newcastle upon Tyne during the 1970s. His brother, Frank, is a lecturer at Kingston University in London.

Career
Before turning to professional acting, Whately began his working life as a folk singer, and still plays the guitar, performing for charity concerts. Along with other Auf Wiedersehen, Pet stars, he makes an appearance at the biennial benefit concert Sunday for Sammy in Newcastle. Before becoming an actor, he started training as an accountant.

His acting career includes several stage plays, among them an adaptation of Twelve Angry Men, and film appearances in The Return of the Soldier, The English Patient, Paranoid and Purely Belter.

Whately's television appearances include episodes of Shoestring, Geordie Racer, Angels, Juliet Bravo, Strangers, Coronation Street, Auf Wiedersehen Pet, Alas Smith and Jones, Look and Read, You Must Be The Husband, B&B, Peak Practice, Skallagrigg, Murder in Mind, Inspector Morse, 2003 Comic Relief Auf Wiedersehen Pet, Lewis, New Tricks, Who Gets the Dog?, The Children and Silent Cry. Whately provided one of the voices for the English-language version of the 1999 claymation Children's television series Hilltop Hospital. He has also done voiceovers for a WaterAid advertisement.

In 1985, Whately appeared in a 3-part Miss Marple adaptation ("A Murder Is Announced") for the BBC. His part, Detective Sergeant Fletcher, opposite John Castle as Inspector Craddock, was very similar to what became the career-defining role he took two years later, when he was cast as Detective Sergeant Lewis, the down-to-earth complement to the eponymous Inspector Morse played by John Thaw. Whately starred opposite Thaw in 32 episodes over 13 years in the hugely successful series that established him as a household name in the UK.

He reprised the role in the spin-off series Lewis, in which Lewis returns to Oxford as a full Inspector. With his new partner, the Cambridge-educated Detective Sergeant James Hathaway (Laurence Fox), Inspector Lewis solves murder mysteries while trying to rebuild his life after his wife's sudden death in a hit-and-run accident and to gain recognition from his initially sceptical new boss.

He was the lead in The Broker's Man, two series of 90 minute self-contained dramas about a former policeman turned insurance fraud investigator.

Richard Marson's book celebrating fifty years of Blue Peter comments that Whately auditioned as a presenter for the show in 1980 but lost out to Peter Duncan.

In 2010 Whately played the lead in the television film Joe Maddison's War about strained family and social relations in wartime. Directed by Patrick Collerton, it presented a view of World War II through the eyes of shipyard worker and World War I veteran Joe Maddison (Kevin Whately) who serves in the Home Guard during the Blitz.

Upon the conclusion of filming the seventh series of Lewis, at the end of 2012, both Whately and Laurence Fox announced that they would take a break of at least a year before appearing in any more episodes. ITV indicated a continuing commitment to the series and that they wished to produce additional episodes of the programme. On 4 November 2012, Whately performed in a radio drama on BBC3 called The Torchbearers, which chronicles the circumstances of several UK citizens whose lives are changed through contact with the Olympic Torch. In 2013, the Live Theatre of Newcastle upon Tyne produced a series of performances of the unique, acclaimed one-person play, White Rabbit, Red Rabbit, which is enacted as a cold reading with no sets or costumes by a different performer each night. Whately was the actor for the sold-out performance of 10 March 2013. Following the end of the ninth and final series of Lewis, Whately announced he had no intention of returning to the role of "Lewis", a character he had played over a span of 28 years.

Whately was the patron of the Central School of Speech and Drama Full House Theatre Company for 2011.

Personal life
Whately lives in Woburn Sands near Milton Keynes with his wife, actress Madelaine Newton, who starred in the 1970s BBC drama When the Boat Comes In. Madelaine starred as Morse's love interest in the Inspector Morse episode entitled Masonic Mysteries (1990; series 4, episode 4). Their daughter Kitty Whately is a classical operatic mezzo-soprano, whose career includes performances with the Edinburgh International Festival, the Royal Opera,  and English National Opera. 

Whately enjoys rock music and plays the guitar; he has cited Pink Floyd and Dire Straits as bands he has particularly enjoyed. He is a fan of Newcastle United on the football field, but says that he prefers rugby league, and as a cricketer admitted to Inspector Morse writer Colin Dexter that he would like to have played cricket professionally for England. Dexter devised the storyline for the Inspector Morse episode "Deceived by Flight" (1989; series 3, episode 3) in which Sergeant Lewis had to go undercover in a cricket team to investigate drug smuggling.

In August 2014, Whately was one of 200 public figures who were signatories to a letter to The Guardian expressing their hope that Scotland would vote to remain part of the United Kingdom in September's independence referendum.

Filmography

Film

Television

Stage

References

External links
 
 

1951 births
Living people
20th-century English male actors
21st-century English male actors
Alumni of Northumbria University
Alumni of the Royal Central School of Speech and Drama
English male film actors
English male radio actors
English male stage actors
English male television actors
English male voice actors
Inspector Morse
People educated at Barnard Castle School
People from Hexham
People from Milton Keynes